Military Academy Karlberg (MHS K) is a Swedish military academy, since its inauguration in 1792 in operation in the Karlberg Palace in Solna, just north of central Stockholm. It is thus the oldest military academy in the world to remain in its original location.

Swedish cadets join the academy as part of their three-year training as do officers aspiring to become navy lieutenants or army and air force captains.

As of 2007, the academy employs approximately 150 people and train some 300 officers annually.  Notwithstanding Karlberg being a military institution, the palace and its park, classified as a historical monument of national interest, is accessible to the general public.

History 

King Gustav III's ambitions to establish an academy for cadets at Ulriksdal Palace were cancelled following his death in 1792 as his wife Queen Sophia Magdalena wished to have that palace as a private residence.  The Kungliga Krigsacademien ("Royal War Academy") was subsequently relocated to Karlberg Palace, the former royal summer residence, where the first generation  of cadets began their education in November the same year.

Shortly after the death of the king, during the regency of Gustav IV Adolf, an enlargement was found necessary to accommodate the officers and construction work on the elongated pavilions of the palace commenced the following year to be accomplished to the design of Carl Christoffer Gjörwell three years later.

Until 1867 both navy and army cadets were educated at Karlberg, after which the two military educations were separated for 132 years before being unified again in 1999, since 2003 accompanied by air force officers.

Heraldry and traditions

Colours, standards and guidons
As of 2012, the Military Academy Karlberg has carried a total of six colours since 1817. The first was presented by His Majesty the King in Rikssalen ("Hall of State") at Karlberg Palace on 6 March 1817. Thereafter, the king has presented colours in 1842, 1920, 1952 and at the school's 200th anniversary on 23 May 1992.

The 1992 colour of the Military Academy Karlberg was presented to the former Military Academy (Krigsskolan Karlberg, KS) at Karlberg Palace in Solna by His Majesty the King Carl XVI Gustaf at the 200-years school anniversary on 23 May 1992. It was drawn by Ingrid Lamby and embroidered by machine in insertion technique by the company Libraria. Blazon: "On blue cloth in the centre, an erect white rapier of Gustaf II Adolf pattern surmounted an open yellow chaplet of laurels and in the second and fourth corners the year 1792 divided with two yellow figures in each corner."

On 18 November 2021, a new colour was presented to Military Academy Karlberg at Karlberg Palace in Solna by His Majesty the King Carl XVI Gustaf.

Coat of arms
The coat of the arms of the Military Academy Karlberg (KS) 1977–1983, the Swedish Army Staff College (Arméns krigshögskola, AKHS) 1983–1994, the Military Academy Karlberg (KS) 1994–1999 and the Military Academy Karlberg (MHS K) from 1999. Blazon: "Azure, an erect rapier argent inside an open chaplet of laurels or. In field III and IV the year 1792 with two figures each field of the last colour".

Medals
In 2003, the Militärhögskolan Karlbergs (MHS K) förtjänstmedalj ("Military Academy Karlberg (MHS K) Medal of Merit") in gold, silver and bronze (MHSKGM/SM/BM) of the 8th size was established. The medal ribbon is of blue moiré with a yellow and a red stripe on each side. A wreath of laurel in gold/silver is attached to the ribbon.

Heads

 1792–1793: Governor Major general Peter Bernhard Piper
 1793–1824: Governor Major general Count Nils August Cronstedt
 1824–1839: Governor General Johan Lefrén
 1839–1850: Governor Colonel Adolf Ammilon
 1850–1861: Governor Lieutenant general Magnus Thulstrup
 1861–1865: Governor Colonel Carl Gustaf Lagercrantz
 1865–1875: Governor Colonel Lars Johan Malcolm Reenstierna
 1875–1882: Colonel Count Gustaf Snoilsky
 1882–1890: Colonel Henning Thulstrup
 1890–1897: Lieutenant colonel Gustaf Uggla
 1897–1901: Colonel Hans Alexander Gustaf Altvater Pantzerhielm
 1901–1906: Lieutenant colonel Baron Adolf Fredrik Constantin Fock
 1906–1912: Lieutenant general Baron Vilhelm Rappe
 1912–1916: Colonel Gustaf Bouveng
 1916–1921: Colonel Erik Nordenskjöld
 1921–1926: Lieutenant colonel Tage af Klercker
 1926–1930: Colonel Carl Uggla
 1930–1933: Colonel Ernst af Klercker
 1933–1937: Colonel Karl Gustaf Emanuel Brandel
 1937–1940: Major general Gustaf Petri
 1940–1944: Colonel Bertil Uggla
 1944–1947: Colonel Gilbert Nordqvist
 1947–1949: Major general Carl Fredrik Reinhold Lemmel
 1949–1953: Colonel Malcolm Murray
 1953–1958: Major general Bengt Carl Olof Hjelm
 1958–1964: Colonel Anders Grafström
 1964–1969: Colonel Nils-Ivar Carlborg
 1969–1973: Senior colonel Gösta Gärdin
 1973–1974: Major general Bengt Liljestrand
 1974–1976: Senior colonel Gunnar Olov Johannes Hallström
 1976–1980:Senior colonel Rolf Frykhammar
 1980–1983: Lieutenant general Curt Sjöö
 1983–1988: Senior colonel Matts Uno Liljegren
 1988–1992: Colonel Knut Anders Gustaf Anerud
 1992–1997: Colonel Lars Björkman
 1997–1998: Colonel Urban Staaff
 1999–2001: Colonel Jan-Axel Thomelius
 2002–2004: Colonel Bengt Nylander
 2005–2008: Colonel Urban Molin
 2008–2009: Lieutenant colonel mst Mats Alnevik
 2009–2013: Colonel Mats Danielsson
 2013–2014: Lieutenant colonel mst Mats Alnevik
 2014–2016: Colonel Rikard Askstedt
 2016–2019: Captain (N) Anna-Karin Broth
 2019–2021: Captain (N) Bo Berg
 2021–present: Colonel Roger Nilsson

Names, designations and locations

See also

 Swedish Defence University
 List of universities in Sweden

Footnotes

References

Notes

Print

Web

External links

 

Military academies
Military installations of Sweden
1792 establishments in Sweden
Military education and training in Sweden
Stockholm Garrison